The 2013–14 Israeli Premier League was the fifteenth season since its introduction in 1999 and the 71st season of top-tier football in Israel. It began on 24 August 2013 and ended on 17 May 2014. Maccabi Tel Aviv were the defending champions, having won their second Premier League title, and 19th championship last season. They successfully defended their title this season.

Teams

A total of fourteen teams are competing in the league, including twelve sides from the 2012–13 season and two promoted team from the 2012–13 Liga Leumit.

Maccabi Netanya and Hapoel Ramat Gan were relegated to the 2013–14 Liga Leumit after finishing the 2012–13 season in the bottom two places.

Maccabi Petah Tikva and Hapoel Ra'anana were promoted after finishing the 2012–13 Liga Leumit in the top two places.

A: The club will play their home games at a neutral venue because their own ground does not meet Premier League requirements.

Personnel and sponsorship

Managerial changes

 Yitav Luzon was Maccabi Petah Tikva sole manager until 19 December 2013, when Kobi Refua was appointed as joint-manager alongside him.

Regular season

Table

Results

Playoffs
Key numbers for pairing determination (number marks position after 26 games):

Top playoff

Table

Results

Bottom playoff

Table

Results

Season statistics

Top scorers

Updated: 17 May 2014Source: Israel Football Association

Scoring
First goal of the season:  Barak Yitzhaki for Maccabi Tel Aviv against Hapoel Ironi Acre, 1st minute (24 August 2013)
Biggest winning margin: 5 goals – 
Hapoel Ramat HaSharon 0–5 Hapoel Tel Aviv (26 October 2013)
Maccabi Tel Aviv 5–0 Hapoel Ironi Acre (21 December 2013)
Most goals scored by a losing team: 4 goals – F.C. Ashdod 4–5 Hapoel Tel Aviv (8 March 2014)
Most goals in a match by one player: 3 goals - 
 Itay Shechter for Hapoel Tel Aviv against Hapoel Ramat HaSharon (26 October 2013)
 Žarko Korać for Hapoel Haifa against Hapoel Ramat HaSharon (21 December 2013)
 Dovev Gabay for Hapoel Be'er Sheva against Hapoel Tel Aviv (30 December 2013)
 Eran Zahavi for Maccabi Tel Aviv against Hapoel Tel Aviv (17 March 2014)
 Eran Zahavi for Maccabi Tel Aviv against Bnei Sakhnin (17 May 2014)

Discipline
First yellow card of the season:  Amiya Taga for Hapoel Ironi Acre against Maccabi Tel Aviv, 7th minute (24 August 2013)
 Most yellow cards by a player: 10
  Ali Ottman (Bnei Sakhnin)
First red card of the season:  Asrat Megersa for Hapoel Ramat HaSharon against Hapoel Haifa, 41st minute (24 August 2013)
 Most red cards by a player: 2
  Ahad Azam (Hapoel Haifa)
  Yossi Dora (Hapoel Haifa)
  Ben Reichert (Hapoel Ramat HaSharon)
  Khaled Khalaila (Bnei Sakhnin)
  Zito (Maccabi Petah Tikva)

Clean sheets
 Most clean sheets: 18
 Maccabi Tel Aviv
 Fewest clean sheets: 1
 Maccabi Petah Tikva

Attendance
 Highest Attendance: 30,000
 Round 6 - Beitar Jerusalem vs. Hapoel Tel Aviv (22 October 2013) at Teddy Stadium. This is the highest attendance of an Israeli Premier League regular season game since 1993. This game is also the highest attendance of a regular Premier League game outside of Ramat Gan Stadium.

See also
2013–14 Israel State Cup

References

Israeli Premier League seasons
1
Israeli Premier League